Sir Donald Campbell  (8 March 1930 – 14 September 2004) was a Scottish anaesthetist and the dean of the Royal College of Anaesthetists from 1982–85.

A native of Rutherglen, he was awarded CBE in the 1987 Birthday Honours and knighted in the 1994 New Year Honours for services to medicine.

References

1930 births
2004 deaths
Scottish anaesthetists
Deans of the Royal College of Anaesthetists
Commanders of the Order of the British Empire
Knights Bachelor